Bengaluru Football Club is an Indian professional football club based in Bangalore, Karnataka. The club competes in the Indian Super League, the top flight of Indian football. The club was established on 20 July 2013, and began its first competitive season in the I-League on 22 September the same year. Since its inception, the club has won two I-League titles including one in its debut season, two Federation Cup titles, one Indian Super League title, and a Super Cup championship making it fourth-most successful club in Indian football.

The club is owned and operated by the Mumbai-based company JSW Group and its managing director Sajjan Jindal. Bangalore has played its home matches at the Sree Kanteerava Stadium since the beginning of the 2014–15 season. Despite only playing four seasons in the I-League, the club was considered one of the model clubs of Indian football. Bengaluru drew praise for bringing a new sense of professionalism to Indian football, including the use of on field equipment meant to help player fitness.

On 22 September 2013, Bengaluru FC played its inaugural match, which ended in a 1–1 draw against Mohun Bagan. The club went on to win the I-League in its debut season and again in 2015–16. They won the ISL title in 2018–19. As well as three league titles, Bengaluru also won two Federation Cups in 2015 and 2017 and a Super Cup in 2018. Between 2015 and 2018, the club represented India in Asian club competition, competing in the AFC Cup for four consecutive years. During the 2016 AFC Cup, Bengaluru reached the final and lost 1–0 to Al-Quwa Al-Jawiya of Iraq. On 28 September 2019, it was announced that the club had entered into a partnership with the Scottish Premier League club Rangers. In 2022, Bengaluru FC beats Mumbai City FC to win 131st Durand Cup

History

Inception
In January 2013, it was reported Mumbai Tigers (then known as Dodsal FC) had failed to register for the upcoming I-League 2nd Division. It was also rumoured the club could instead enter the I-League, India's top football league, directly through cash payment to the All India Football Federation (AIFF) and a promise to build a new football stadium. On 12 January, it was announced the AIFF had called for an executive meeting to decide whether to allow teams to enter directly the I-League for the 2013–14 season. At around the same time, uncertainty whether institutional clubs Air India, ONGC and then-suspended Mohun Bagan would be allowed to play in the league that season arose.

During the AIFF executive meeting on 15 January, it was officially announced the federation, in an effort to make the I-League more pan-Indian,  would accept bids for two new, direct-entry clubs for the 2013–14 season from corporate groups. Corporate groups could bid to create teams outside Kolkata and Goa, and would have to create new infrastructure in their cities. The winning bids would be announced in March 2013 and the new clubs would be replacements for Air India and ONGC.

On 8 March 2013, it was reported JSW Group, which had previously considered forming a football club in Bangalore, was interested in bidding for a spot in the I-League. It was also reported AR Khaleel, the President of the Karnataka State Football Association and a senior official of the AIFF, had suggested Bangalore could be a host venue for the 2017 FIFA U-17 World Cup and that a corporate team in the city could help build new infrastructure. On 15 May that year, it was announced the AIFF had received three bids for two direct-entry spots. The bids came from JSW Group, Dodsal Group, and a consortium from Kerala.

On 28 May 2013, it was officially announced JSW Group had won the rights to form a direct-entry team for the 2013–14 I-League season in Bangalore, which would be done through the sports branch, JSW Sports. It was also announced JSW Group would set up a youth academy in Bangalore and would construct new infrastructure. On 20 July, JSW Group officially launched the club as "Bengaluru Football Club" at launch event at the Bangalore Football Stadium, which was announced as the club's home stadium for the upcoming season. Along with the club name and stadium, the squad, club crest, colours and home kit for the season were revealed.

Ashley Westwood era (2013–2016)

Immediately after winning the rights to form a direct-entry side, JSW Group began assembling a team. The club's first signing was midfielder Thoi Singh from Mumbai Tigers. On 2 July 2013, it was announced former Blackburn Rovers assistant manager Ashley Westwood would become the club's first head coach. On 16 July, JSW Group signed the club's first two foreign players, defenders John Johnson and Curtis Osano. Three days later, it was announced the club had signed the India national team captain Sunil Chhetri from Sporting Portugal B.

On 22 September that year, the club played their first official match in the I-League against Mohun Bagan at Bangalore Football Stadium. After a scoreless first-half, Bengaluru scored their first official goal in the 49th minute through Sean Rooney. In injury time, Mohun Bagan equalized through Chinadorai Sabeeth to end the match 1–1. Their next match brought Begaluru's first win, defeating Rangdajied United 3–0 at the Bangalore Football Stadium.

The club played their first away game on 26 October 2013 against East Bengal at the Kalyani Stadium. In their first losing away game,  Bengaluru lost 0–2 to the Kolkata-based side. Exactly a month later, the club won their first away match against Salgaocar at the Duler Stadium 2–1.

On 15 January 2014, Bengaluru played the first game in their first domestic cup competition, the Federation Cup,  against Sporting Goa at the Manjeri Stadium. Bengaluru won 5–3 but went on to draw one match and lose another, and were knocked out in the group stage of the tournament.

On 21 April 2014, Bengaluru defeated Dempo 4–2 at the Fatorda Stadium to claim their first I-League title in their debut season. During the 2014–15 season, Bengaluru again participated in the Federation Cup, winning their first trophy on 11 January 2015 after defeating Dempo 2–1 in the final. Despite the cup victory and entering the season as defending league champions, Bengaluru lost the I-League title on the last day of the season, when they drew 1–1 against Mohun Bagan, who gained the title. Despite losing the title, Bengaluru ended the season with a 13-match unbeaten run. Bengaluru also participated in the Asian club competition for the first time but failed to qualify for the AFC Champions League; the team also reached Round 16 for the AFC Cup.

The next season, Bengaluru won their second I-League title, defeating Salgaocar 2–0 at home on 17 April 2016. The club also advanced further into the AFC Cup, reaching the quarter-finals after defeating Kitchee 3–2 in Round 16. Despite the club's achievement, Ashley Westwood left the club at the end of the season.

Albert Roca era and transition to Indian Super League (2016–2018)

Bengaluru FC appointed former FC Barcelona assistant coach Albert Roca as the head coach for two seasons. In his first game in charge of the club, Bengaluru FC won 1–0 against Tampines Rovers in the first leg of the quarter-finals of the AFC Cup 2016, and became the third Indian team to qualify for the tournament's semi-finals. They reached the final on 19 October 2016, the first Indian team to do so, by defeating defending champions Johor Darul Ta'zim F.C. 3–1 at home in the second leg of the semi-finals. On 5 November, Bengaluru played against the Iraqi club Al-Quwa Al-Jawiya in the final at the Suheim Bin Hamad Stadium in Qatar, losing the game 0–1. Bengaluru's first 2016–17 I-League season under Roca was not as successful; the club finished the season in fourth position, the lowest since 2013, after a winless run of seven games in January and February 2017. The club won their second Federation Cup title under Albert Roca in 2017, defeating Mohun Bagan 2–0 in the final. The club also reached the Inter-zonal final in the 2017 AFC Cup.

Carles Cuadrat era (2018–2021)

After two seasons as an assistant coach at Bengaluru FC, Carles Cuadrat took over as the head coach in July 2018 for the first time in his career. In his debut season, Bengaluru won the fifth edition of the ISL for the first time. The season brought multiple records, including an 11-game undefeated run in the league and a six-game winning run. They became the first team to finish on top of the regular season twice in succession and the first team to win the title after finishing top in the league phase. In 2019–20, Bengaluru reached the ISL play-offs after finishing third in the league phase. Under Cuadrat, Bengaluru set new records in 2019–20, becoming the first team to keep 11 clean sheets and went on a 17-match unbeaten run at home, 2 full seasons not losing in their Kanteereva Stadium. Towards the end of the 2019–20 season, Bengaluru beat Paro FC 9–1 at the Kanteerava in the AFC Cup qualifiers; their biggest-ever win. In January 2021, Bengaluru FC parted ways with Carles Cuadret on mutual consent.  The change of coach did not bring any benefit to the team, which worsened its position in the table with the new coach and only got 2 wins in the remaining 11 games of the championship.

Marco Pezzaiuoli era (2021–2022)
On 12 February 2021, the club announced Marco Pezzaiuoli as their new head coach on a three-year performance-based contract. Under his stewardship, Bengaluru began its 2020–21 Indian Super League campaign on 20 November against NorthEast United with a 4–2 win, followed by a 7 match winless streak. The team failed to qualify for the playoffs for the second time in a row, confirming the departure of Marco.

Crest, colours and kits

Bengaluru FC' home livery was unveiled during the 21 July JSW launch; the crest features the Bangalore Palace coloured white to symbolize the victory of the Wodeyars, who won the palace back. In the middle of the crest, a blue Gandaberunda – a mythical two-headed bird, symbolizes the pride, resilience, and bravery of the people of Bengaluru. The Gandaberunda is taken from the coat of arms of the state of Karnataka. On 24 January 2015, Bengaluru revealed Eddie The Eagle as its official mascot.

The club colour is blue; it is often known by the nickname "The Blues".

Kit manufacturers and shirt sponsors

In July 2014, Bengaluru signed a deal with Puma, which became the club's kit sponsor from the 2014–15 season. The club's parent company JSW Group was the team's principal sponsor from inception until 2018, when the club signed a four-year deal with South Korean car company Kia Motors as the principal sponsor. The contract was terminated by the start of the 2020–21 season and JSW Group returned as the principal sponsor.

In July 2020, DafaNews renewed partnership with Indian Super League club Bengaluru FC. Partnership was extended the deal by a year, by which DafaNews will remain the club's Official Digital News Portal.

Stadium

In their first season, Bengaluru FC played home games at Bangalore Football Stadium in the city centre. The West stand was the largest and most capacious stand, and housed the VIP boxes during I-League and other major matches. During the club's launch, it was announced the team would play at Bangalore Football Stadium for the 2013–14 I-League season. The stadium had a capacity of 15,000 and its pitch was covered with astroturf.

From the 2014–15 season, the club started playing home games at the 24,000 capacity Sree Kanteerava Stadium. There are eight entrances to the stadium, and nine stands are used for Bengaluru FC matches. West Block A stand is the largest stand in the stadium and is home to the West Block Blues supporters' club. Due to criticisms of the artificial pitch at Bangalore Football Stadium, the new stadium's pitch is covered with natural grass. All stands except the North Stand have permanent seating. Some fans refer to the Sree Kanteerva Stadium as 'The Fortress".

Supporters

Bengaluru FC is reputed to have one of the most vocal fanbases in India. The fans are known as the West Block Blues, which is named after West Block A in the Bangalore Football Stadium.

The players and the coach have often acknowledged the fans' support in their success, and called them "The 12th Man". Apart from supporting Bengaluru FC, the fan club has frequently supported the India national football team, and unfurled a  banner at the India vs Guam game.

Rivalries
In the initial years of the club, Bengaluru FC played in the I-league before joining the Indian Super League. The club played important games against Mohun Bagan, sparking a rivalry between the clubs which continued in ISL when Mohun Bagan joined the league as ATK Mohun Bagan.

South Indian Derby

Bengaluru FC has also developed a famous rivalry with South Indian club Kerala blasters. The rivalry stems from the competition between the clubs' fan bases; Manjappada and Bengaluru's West Block Blues.

Statistics

Players

First-team squad

Out on loan

Reserves and academy

Personnel

Current technical staff

Management

Team records

Overview

Head Coaches' record

. Includes the statistics of only official games with the results at the full time counted.

Honours

Continental
 AFC Cup
Runners-up (1): 2016

Domestic

League
Indian Super League/I-League (First Division)
Champions (3): 2013–14, 2015–16,2018–19
Runners-up (3): 2014–15, 2017–18, 2022-23

Cup
Federation Cup/Super Cup
Winners (3): 2014–15, 2016–17, 2018

Durand Cup
Winners (1): 2022

Award
 AFC Cup Fair Play Award: 2016

AFC club ranking

Performance in AFC competitions

 AFC Champions League: 2 appearances
 2015: Preliminary Round 1
 2017: Preliminary Round 2
 AFC Cup: 5 appearances
 2015: Round of 16
 2016: Runners-up
 2017: Inter-zone finals
 2018: Inter-zone semi-finals
 2020: Qualifying play-off
 2021: Group stage

eSports
The organizers of ISL introduced eISL, a FIFA video game tournament for the ISL playing clubs, each represented by two players. Bengaluru FC hosted a series of qualifying games for all the participants wanting to represent the club in eISL. On 20 November the club announced signing of the two players.

Roster

Affiliated clubs

The following club(s) are affiliated with Bengaluru FC:
  Rangers FC

See also
 List of Bengaluru FC players
 List of Bengaluru FC seasons
 List of Bengaluru FC records and statistics
 Indian football clubs in Asian competitions

References

Footnotes

External links

 
 
 

 
Association football clubs established in 2013
I-League clubs
2013 establishments in Karnataka
JSW Group
Sport in Bangalore
Football clubs in Bangalore
Indian Super League teams